Munida is the largest genus of squat lobsters in the family Munididae, with over 240 species.

Species

Munida abelloi Macpherson, 1994
Munida acacia Ahyong, 2007
Munida acantha Macpherson, 1994
 Munida acola Macpherson, 2009
Munida aequalis Ahyong & Poore, 2004
Munida affinis A. Milne Edwards 1880
Munida africana Balss, 1913
Munida agave Macpherson & Baba, 1993
Munida albiapicula Baba & Yu, 1987
Munida alia Baba, 1994
Munida alonsoi Macpherson, 1994
Munida amathea Macpherson & de Saint Laurent, 1991
Munida amblytes Macpherson, 1994
Munida andamanica Alcock, 1894
Munida angulata Benedict 1902
Munida angusta Macpherson, 2004
Munida antliae Macpherson, 2006
Munida antonbruuni (Tirmizi & Javed, 1980)
Munida apheles Macpherson, 2006
Munida apodis Macpherson, 2004
Munida arabica Tirmizi & Javed, 1992
Munida arae Macpherson, 2006
Munida armata Baba, 1988
Munida armilla Macpherson, 1994
Munida asprosoma Ahyong & Poore, 2004
Munida atlantica de Melo-Fihlo & de Melo, 1994
Munida aulakodes Macpherson, 2006
Munida babai Tirmizi & Javed, 1976
Munida bapensis Hendrickx, 2000
Munida barangei Macpherson, 1994
Munida barbeti Galil, 1999
Munida beanii Verrill, 1908
Munida benedicti Chace, 1942
Munida benguela de Saint Laurent & Macpherson, 1988
Munida brachytes Macpherson, 1994
Munida caesura Macpherson & Baba, 1993
Munida carinata Baba, 2005
Munida cerisa Ahyong, 2007
Munida chacei de Melo-Fihlo and de Melo, 1992
Munida chathamensis Baba, 1974
Munida chydaea Ahyong & Poore, 2004
Munida clinata Macpherson, 1994
Munida collier Ahyong, 2007
Munida coltroi de Melo-Filho and de Melo, 2006
Munida columbae Macpherson, 2006
Munida comorina Alcock & Anderson, 1899
Munida compacta Macpherson, 1997
Munida compressa Baba, 1988
Munida congesta Macpherson, 1999
Munida constricta A. Milne Edwards 1880
Munida cornuta Macpherson, 1994
Munida crassa Baba, 1982
Munida curvimana A. Milne Edwards & Bouver, 1894
Munida curvipes Benedict, 1902
Munida curvirostris Henderson, 1885
Munida debilis Benedict, 1902
Munida declivis Baba, 1994
Munida delicata Macpherson, 2004
Munida descensa Macpherson, 2006
Munida devestiva Macpherson, 2006
Munida disgrega Baba, 2005
Munida dispar Macpherson & Baba, 1993
Munida dissita Macpherson, 1999
Munida distiza Macpherson, 1994
Munida ducoussoi Macpherson & de Saint Laurent, 1991
Munida eclepsis Macpherson, 1994
Munida elachia Macpherson, 1994
Munida elfina Boone 1927
Munida endeavourae Ahyong & Poore, 2004
Munida erato Macpherson, 1994
Munida erugata Macpherson, 2006
Munida eudora Macpherson & Baba, 1993
Munida evarne Macpherson & de Saint Laurent, 1991
Munida evermanni Benedict 1901
Munida exilis Ahyong, 2007
Munida fasciata Macpherson, 2006
Munida flinti Benedict 1902
Munida forceps A. Milne Edwards 1880
Munida foresti Macpherson & de Saint Laurent, 2002
Munida fornacis Macpherson, 2006
Munida galaxaura Macpherson, 1996
Munida gilii Macpherson, 1993
Munida glabella Macpherson, 2000
Munida gordoae Macpherson, 1994
Munida gracilipes Faxon, 1893
Munida gracilis Henderson, 1885
Munida gregaria (Fabricius, 1793)
Munida guineae Miyake & Baba, 1970
Munida guttata Macpherson, 1994
Munida haswelli Henderson, 1885
Munida heblingi de Melo-Filho and de Melo, 1994
Munida heteracantha Ortmann, 1892
Munida hispida Benedict, 1902
Munida honshuensis Benedict, 1902
Munida howensis Ahyong, 2007
Munida hyalina Macpherson, 1994
Munida icela Ahyong, 2007
Munida idyia Macpherson, 1994
Munida ignea Macpherson, 2006
Munida inornata Henderson, 1885
Munida insularis Macpherson, 1999
Munida intermedia A. Milne Edwards & Bouvier, 1899
Munida iris A. Milne Edwards, 1880
Munida irrasa A. Milne Edwards 1880
Munida isos Ahyong & Poore, 2004
Munida janetae Tirmizi & Javed, 1992
Munida japonica Stimpson, 1858
Munida kapala Ahyong & Poore, 2004
Munida kawamotoi Osawa & Okuno, 2002
Munida keiensis Baba, 2005
Munida kuboi Yanagita, 1943
Munida laevis Macpherson & Baba, 1993
Munida latior Baba, 2005
Munida leagora Macpherson, 1994
Munida lenticularis Macpherson & de Saint Laurent, 1991
Munida leptitis Macpherson, 1994
Munida leptosyne Macpherson, 1994
Munida limatula Macpherson, 2004
Munida limula Macpherson & Baba, 1993
Munida lineola Macpherson, 1994
Munida llenasi Macpherson, 2006
Munida longicheles Macpherson & de Saint Laurent, 1991
Munida macrobrachia Hendrickx, 2003
Munida magniantennulata Baba & Türkay, 1992
Munida major Baba, 1988
Munida masi Macpherson, 1994
Munida masoae Macpherson, 1996
Munida media Benedict, 1902
Munida melite Macpherson & Baba, 1993
Munida mexicana Benedict, 1902
Munida microphthalma A. Milne Edwards, 1880
Munida microps Alcock, 1894
Munida micula Macpherson, 1996
Munida miles A. Milne Edwards, 1880
Munida militaris Henderson, 1885
Munida miniata Macpherson, 1996
Munida minuta Macpherson, 1993
Munida moliae Macpherson, 1994
Munida montemaris Bahamonde & López, 1962
Munida muscae Macpherson & de Saint Laurent, 2002
Munida nesaea Macpherson & Baba, 1993
Munida nesiotes Macpherson, 1999
Munida notata Macpherson, 1994
Munida notialis Baba, 2005
Munida nuda Benedict, 1902
Munida obesa Faxon, 1893
Munida oblonga Macpherson, 2006
Munida ocellata Macpherson & de Saint Laurent, 1991
Munida offella Macpherson, 1996
Munida olivarae Macpherson, 1994
Munida ommata Macpherson, 2004
Munida oritea Macpherson & Baba, 1993
Munida pagesi Macpherson, 1994
Munida parca Macpherson, 1996
Munida parile Macpherson & Machordom, 2005
Munida parvioculata Baba, 1982
Munida parvula Macpherson, 1993
Munida pasithea Macpherson & de Saint Laurent, 1991
Munida pavonis Macpherson, 2004
Munida pectinata Macpherson & Machordom, 2005
Munida perlata Benedict, 1902
Munida petronioi de Melo-Filho & de Melo, 1994
Munida pherusa Macpherson & Baba, 1993
Munida philippinensis Macpherson & Baba, 1993
Munida pilorhyncha Miyake & Baba, 1966
Munida polynoe Macpherson & de Saint Laurent, 1991
Munida pontoporea Macpherson, 1994
Munida profunda Macpherson & de Saint Laurent, 1991
Munida prominula Baba, 1988
Munida propinqua Faxon, 1893
Munida proto Macpherson, 1994
Munida psamathe Macpherson, 1994
Munida pseliophora Macpherson, 1994
Munida psylla Macpherson, 1994
Munida pubescens sp. nov.
Munida pulchra Macpherson & de Saint Laurent, 1991
Munida pumila Macpherson, 2004
Munida punctata Macpherson, 1997
Munida pusilla Benedict, 1902
Munida pusiola Macpherson, 1993
Munida pygmaea Macpherson, 1996
Munida quadrispina Benedict, 1902
Munida redacta Ahyong, 2007
Munida refulgens Faxon, 1893
Munida remota Baba, 1990
Munida rhodonia Macpherson, 1994
Munida robusta A. Milne Edwards, 1880
Munida rogeri Macpherson, 1994
Munida rosea sp. nov.
Munida roshanei Tirmizi, 1966
Munida rosula Macpherson, 1994
Munida rubella Macpherson & de Saint Laurent, 1991
Munida rubiesi Macpherson, 1991
Munida rubridigitalis Baba, 1994
Munida rubrimana Ahyong, 2007
Munida rubrovata Macpherson & de Saint Laurent, 1991
Munida rufiantennulata Baba, 1969
Munida rugosa (Fabricius, 1775)
Munida runcinata Macpherson, 1994
Munida rupicola Lin & Chan, 2005
Munida rutllanti Zariquiey Álvarez, 1952
Munida sacksi Macpherson, 1993
Munida sagamiensis Doflein, 1902
Munida sanctipauli Henderson, 1885
Munida sao Macpherson, 1994
Munida sarsi Huus, 1935
Munida sculpta Benedict, 1902
Munida semoni Ortmann 1894
Munida sentai Baba, 1986
Munida serrata Mayo, 1972
Munida shaula Macpherson & de Saint Laurent, 2002
Munida simplex Benedict, 1902
Munida simulatrix Macpherson & Machordom, 2005
Munida sinensis Zong & Wang, 1989
Munida speciosa von Martens, 1878
Munida sphinx Macpherson & Baba, 1993
Munida spicae Macpherson & de Saint Laurent, 2002
Munida spilota Macpherson, 1994
Munida spinicruris Ahyong & Poore, 2004
Munida spinifrons Henderson, 1885
Munida spinosa Henderson, 1885
Munida spinulifera Miers, 1884
Munida spissa Macpherson, 1996
Munida stia Macpherson, 1994
Munida stigmatica Macpherson, 1994
Munida stimpsoni A. Milne Edwards, 1880
Munida striata Chace, 1942
Munida striola Macpherson & Baba, 1993
Munida subcaeca Bouvier, 1922
Munida taenia Macpherson, 1994
Munida tangaroa Ahyong, 2007
Munida tenella Benedict, 1902
Munida tenuimana Sars, 1872
Munida thoe Macpherson, 1994
Munida tiresias Macpherson, 1994
Munida tropicalis A. Milne Edwards & Bouvier, 1897
Munida tuberculata Henderson, 1885
Munida tyche Macpherson, 1994
Munida typhle Macpherson, 1994
Munida valida Smith, 1883
Munida victoria de Melo-Filho, 1996
Munida vigiliarum Alcock, 1901
Munida volantis Macpherson, 2004
Munida williamsi Hendrickx, 2000
Munida zebra Macpherson, 1994

References

Further reading

Squat lobsters
Taxa named by William Elford Leach
Decapod genera